Praeschausia is a monotypic moth genus of the family Notodontidae erected by Foster Hendrickson Benjamin in 1932. Its only species, Praeschausia zapata, was first described by William Schaus in 1920. It is found in Mexico.

References

Notodontidae
Monotypic moth genera